Voices & Images is the debut studio album by the German band Camouflage, released by Atlantic Records and Metronome on March 4, 1988. Four singles were released from the album: "The Great Commandment", "Strangers' Thoughts", "Neighbours", "That Smiling Face". On 12 October 2018 is announced the release of limited edition of the album via German Tapete Records to mark the 30th anniversary of "Voices & Images", the album now earns a repackaged, limited edition reissue featuring deleted remixes, rare versions and B-sides. Available as a double CD and triple vinyl.

Track listing

Personnel
Heiko Maile
Marcus Meyn
Oliver Kreyssig

Credits
Co-producer – Heiko Maile (tracks: 1 to 3, 5, 7 to 12)
Performer – Heiko Maile, Marcus Meyn, Oliver Kreyssig 
Producer – Axel Henninger (tracks: 1 to 3, 5, 7 to 12), Camouflage 
Recorded By, Mixed By – Axel Henninger

References

External links
Official discography

1988 debut albums
Camouflage (band) albums